Apatampa is a dance performed by the Fanti's in Ghana. Historically, It is believed that, the name of the dance was derived from an incident that happened a long time ago where a giant use to attack and kill the Fante men at night. One night, when the giant was fighting the last man, a woman appeared and danced gracefully to distract the fight which gain the attention of everyone. She was praised for separating the fight (apata ampa in Fante).

Instruments 

Instruments used in performing the Apatampa Dance includes; a large rectangular plywood where drummers strike the open surface with their palms, a pitch metal whistle which is locally known as "aben" and castanet (locally known as afrikyiwa)

Performance 
The dance start with the individual making a beat by hitting both tights with both hands twice  and clapping the hands on the third beat. Then after, beats the chest twice to make the fourth and fifth beat. This is being done with a smile and cheerful face  while moving. Also, the dance performance goes in the rhythm of the instruments.

References 
Ghanaian dances

External Links 

 Young girls dancing Apatampa
 Apatampa Audio and Video Selections